Michael Holt is a superhero appearing in American comic books published by DC Comics. He is the second character to take up the Mister Terrific mantle.

Echo Kellum portrayed a version of the character renamed Curtis Holt in the CW Arrowverse series Arrow, from the fourth to the final, eighth, season.

Publication history
Michael Holt was created by John Ostrander and Tom Mandrake and first appeared in Spectre (vol. 3) #54 (June 1997).

Fictional character biography
At a very young age, Michael Holt shows remarkable intelligence, reading and assimilating the works of Aage Bohr, Albert Einstein, Max Planck and Richard Feynman, the pantheon of theoretical physics. Michael grows up with his mentally challenged older brother, Jeffrey, whom he loved dearly. When Jeffrey dies at the age of 12, Michael is devastated.

Holt displays "a natural aptitude for having natural aptitudes", as he calls it, easily picking up and retaining complex skills and abilities that others spend their entire lives perfecting. Before he begins his career as a superhero, he already possesses 14 Ph.Ds (two in engineering and physics—including doctorates and master's degrees in law, psychology, chemistry, political science, computer science, rocket science, and mathematics)—is a self-made multi-millionaire with a high tech firm called Cyberwear (subsequently sold to Waynetech), and is a gold medal-winning Olympic decathlete.

The accidental deaths of his wife and unborn child are a devastating blow to Holt. He considers himself responsible for the accident as he made his wife late for church by arguing with her about the value of religion. While contemplating suicide, he is met by the Spectre, who tells him about Terry Sloane, the Golden Age superhero known as Mister Terrific. Inspired by Sloane's life story, he takes the name Mister Terrific and later joins the current Justice Society of America (JSA), eventually serving as its chairman.

Initially, he wears ordinary clothes and a leather jacket with Sloane's "Fair Play" emblem on the back. Later, he switches to a T-shaped mask composed of electronic nanites, a black and white costume with red trim, and a collarless jacket in the same colors (the black sections of tunic and jacket forming a "T") with "Fair Play" written on the sleeves and "Terrific" across the back.

For a time, he acts as spokesperson for Tylerco and consults for the company on industrial espionage and security matters in exchange for it helping fund a youth center Terrific has started.

Holt has a friendly rivalry with Batman, his opposite number in the Justice League of America (in his identity as Bruce Wayne, Batman owns Holt's business). Holt has encountered Sloane twice through time travel, with Sloane expressing pride in having so worthy a successor. Holt has been noted as the most intelligent member of the JSA in its history, surpassing his predecessor. He is also known as the third-smartest person in the world, and this notion now appears to be widespread within the DC Universe.

Justice Society of America chairmanship
During a conflict over leadership of the Justice Society between former chairman Hawkman and then-current chairman Sand, Terrific is elected as the JSA's new chairman by his teammates, despite not actively seeking the office. He serves in this capacity until the team disbands following the Infinite Crisis.

Mr. Terrific currently remains a member of the reformed Justice Society of America. He resumed his chairmanship from the last incarnation of the team, but his leadership responsibilities in Checkmate eventually prompt him to relinquish the position to Power Girl.

Infinite Crisis

Mr. Terrific is part of the team assembled by Batman for an attack on the Brother Eye satellite responsible for controlling the OMACs. He plays a critical role as his invisibility to technology allows him to reach the satellite's propulsion system, sending it crashing to Earth. During this time, he meets and befriends another African American superhero—Black Lightning.

One Year Later

In the "One Year Later" storyline, Holt is still a member of the JSA, and he has also become part of the United Nations Security Council's intelligence agency, Checkmate. He holds the position of White King's Bishop initially, but when the previous White King (Alan Scott) is forced to resign, he becomes Checkmate's new White King, complicating his relationship with Sasha Bordeaux, Checkmate's Black Queen. He has also given up his chairman position, which has been taken over by Power Girl. Mr. Terrific has also established an ill-defined mentorship with Firestorm over the missing year; the specifics of their meeting are yet to be documented.

Holt is forced to face his issues with faith once again when the JSA confront Gog, a God of the Second World. Not only is Gog incapable of hearing Terrific due to his lack of faith, but during a trip to the Earth-Two of the new multiverse, Holt encounters his Earth-Two counterpart, who is now a devout believer after having a religious experience on the day his wife survived her accident.

Final Crisis

During the Final Crisis of Humanity, the war between Darkseid and the human world, Mister Terrific, along with Cheetah and Snapper Carr, are left trapped in the ruins of Checkmate headquarters, unable to get past the brainwashed metahuman, and caring for Sasha, who prefers using her OMAC programming to shut down her bodily functions rather than falling prey to the Anti-Life Equation. Forcefully waking up Sasha, thus condemning her, Michael Holt has no choice but to activate a new OMAC population, programmed to obey him rather than Brother Eye, and to protect the last few humans against the new Justifiers.

Death and return
In Justice Society of America vol. 3 series, Mr. Terrific takes over the research, just as the low-level villain Tapeworm appears on the news, taking hostages and demanding that Wildcat show himself. All-American Kid and King Chimera must remain in the brownstone, Mister Terrific retreats to his lab, and the rest of the team leaves to help Wildcat. All-American Kid goes into the lab and stabs Mister Terrific in the back, pretending to have been mind controlled. Justice Society members arrive back at headquarters to discover Mr. Terrific has been attacked, and Dr. Mid-Nite tends to his wounds. In the end, Mister Terrific succumbs to his injuries and Alan Scott reports that he has died. However, Scott is able to use the power of the Green Flame to slow down time around Mister Terrific's body in the hopes that he can be healed before brain death occurs. Michael is restored to life by the magic of the new Doctor Fate, and attacks All-American Kid, revealing that he is actually the teenage psychopath known as Kid Karnevil, and subdues him. For a short time during his recovery, Michael is forced to use a wheelchair, although he still finds time to upgrade Mister America's whip.

The New 52
In September 2011, The New 52 rebooted DC's continuity. In this new timeline, Mister Terrific received a self-titled ongoing series written by Eric Wallace and drawn by Roger Robinson. Holt begins sporting a new costume designed by Cully Hamner. He is also in a relationship with Karen Starr.

On January 12, 2012, DC announced that it would be ending six of the lowest selling New 52 titles in April, replacing them with six different titles in the revamp's second wave. Mister Terrific was cancelled with issue #8 in April 2012. The series ends with Mister Terrific being displaced to a parallel universe where he continues to appear in the Earth-2 series.

DC Rebirth
In Dark Days: The Forge, Mister Terrific returns to Prime Earth as Batman unveils a containment unit in The Lunar Batcave bearing the Plastic Man logo, and suggests it is time to release him.

Mister Terrific stumbles upon Simon Stagg's plot to open a portal to the Dark Multiverse with Metamorpho transmutated to Nth Metal. While trying to get Simon Stagg to close the portal with the help of Plastic Man, Mister Terrific is sucked in to the portal with Plastic Man and Metamorpho as Plastic Man shields them from the Dark Multiverse energy. Upon arriving on a lifeless world, they encounter Phantom Girl who has been trapped in her intangible form and had no knowledge of sending a signal. When the four of them find a computer in the gut of a dead giant creature, they are greeted by a hologram of Tom Strong who states that they are needed to save the universe. Mister Terrific, Plastic Man, and Metamorpho learn from Phantom Girl that she was stuck in intangible form since she was a child. After the four of them made it back to their world, Mister Terrific tries to leave the three of them at Simon Stagg's compound only to be drawn back to them. Due to the effects of the Dark Multiverse energy, Mister Terrific concludes that they can't go their separate ways due to this bond. Mister Terrific was able to come up with a compromise with Simon Stagg by investigating the bond at his facility. This leads to Mister Terrific to find the Tom Strong that sent left the message and find out how to get untethered by the dark energy.

In the "Watchmen" sequel "Doomsday Clock," Mister Terrific was seen with the Justice Society after Doctor Manhattan undid the experiment that erased the Justice Society and the Legion of Super-Heroes.

Religious beliefs
While being held captive by Onimar Synn on an adventure with the Justice Society on Thanagar, Holt first expresses his disbelief in souls and that he is uncomfortable with the notion of reincarnation after witnessing the return of teammate Hawkman. Holt states, "when my wife, Paula, was killed in a car accident ... she was gone. I didn't feel her 'soul' around me. Didn't feel anything". He later elaborates on this by explaining that his lack of faith extends back prior to his wife's death, and states that he blames himself for her death as he delayed her going to church because the two of them argued about the merits of faith. Holt believes that she would have avoided the accident if she had not been arguing with him. He acknowledges the irony of this given such factors as the Spectre's role in his origin, and his encounter with the likes of the Spirit King, but he still maintains his skepticism about faith and religion.

After a near-death experience where he sees his wife and unborn child (whom he decides to name 'Terry' after the original Mister Terrific), Holt's atheism is shaken and he agrees to attend a church service with teammate Doctor Mid-Nite.

However, this attempt to find religion apparently is not satisfying as Holt is also seen getting into a theological discussion with Ragman during the Infinite Crisis (Ragman is Jewish while Mr. Terrific describes himself as an atheist). When asked if he has faith in anything, Terrific answered, "Sure I do. I've got faith in my team."

During Thy Kingdom Come, when Power Girl is sent back to the Earth-2 pre-Crisis universe, she meets her world's Michael Holt, who is ironically a priest after he has a religious experience. During the same storyline, 'our' Holt told Doctor Mid-Nite that he feels that his issues with faith actually stem from his own inability to understand it, confessing that he wants to believe but something inside him will not let him.

Powers, abilities, and equipment
Holt is described as having "a natural aptitude for having natural aptitudes"; picking up complicated skills quickly and retaining them, such as performing emergency surgery on teammate Alan Scott after reading about the procedure in a medical textbook and subsequently becoming Dr. Mid-Nite's assistant. As Holt himself put it, "everyone has a talent... Mine is learning."
Holt is also known as the third-smartest man on Earth.
He is aided by his "T-Spheres", floating robotic spheres with multiple functions, holographic projection, projecting laser grids, and recording, communication, linking with and manipulating other electronic devices, from satellites to electronic locks. They allow Terrific to fly by bearing his weight, and can be used as weapons, both by exploding with enough force to send Shazam flying back, generating powerful electric charges, and strike as flying, projectile weapons. They respond to his mental and vocal commands. He once described them as "curious" about something, implying that they possess an artificial intelligence.
He is invisible nearly to all forms of electronic detection (except infrared or sonar). Despite a claim to Black Lightning in Infinite Crisis that "I've got one superpower: I'm invisible to technology," in all other instances this ability is tied to nanotechnology woven into his specially designed "T-Mask" (which is molecularly bonded to his face and can appear and disappear at will) and costume. Mr. Terrific was apparently the only superhero whom the OMACs could not detect. The only exception to his invisibility, however, is that of the Red Tornado, who, for reasons yet unknown, is capable of seeing Terrific despite being an android. Red Tornado's status as a sentient wind elemental merely occupying an android body likely explains his ability to see Holt. 
Through his mask, Holt can change instantaneously into costume and back again. His mask also protects his face from chemicals. The mask works in conjunction with an earpiece to act as a communications system, and also doubles as an encephalic broadcaster, picking up aggregate thought waves, allowing him to communicate with his T-Spheres, and even project a speaking hologram of himself, even if he is injured or too weak to speak. The mask can also form and transmit images on low- or high-band light frequencies visible to his teammate Doctor Mid-Nite.
He is a black belt in 6 different martial arts disciplines and an Olympic Gold Medalist in the decathlon.
Holt is also a polymath who has specialized in multiple fields of medicine, engineering, and science. He possesses fourteen Ph.Ds (two of which are in engineering and physics).
 Along with teammate and friend Doctor Mid-Nite and Batman, Mister Terrific is one of the three main superheroes with medical training in the DC Universe. Although it is not known if he has an M.D., he did participate in the autopsy of Sue Dibny in Identity Crisis.
Holt is also polyglot, though the extent of this hasn't been revealed. He has been shown to speak the languages of the fictional nations of Kahndaq and Bialya. Given Holt's propensity for learning, it is likely that he speaks several other languages as well.

Other versions

Earth-2
In 2008, an alternate version of Michael Holt from a new Earth-2 appeared in DC stories. This version is a college professor, who has a religious experience after his wife is nearly killed in an accident. This version of Paula Holt is merely left in a coma rather than dying immediately. While contemplating suicide after spending three months trying unsuccessfully to find a cure, he saves another man who is preparing to jump off the same bridge, takes him to a church that was the nearest illuminated building, and the man he saves prays for him. After his wife regains consciousness the following day, this Michael Holt went on to become a devout Christian. He helps the Power Girl of New Earth to return home. When the Justice Society arrives on Earth-2, Professor Holt confronts his counterpart Michael Holt from New-Earth. Professor Holt introduces the Justice Society to his wife, Paula, although New-Earth Michael just introduces himself as Mister Terrific rather than reveal his true name.

Flashpoint
In the alternate timeline of the Flashpoint event, Mister and Missus Terrific are framed for unknown crimes when they discover Outsider's illicit schemes, and are attempting to assassinate him. Mister and Missus Terrific are both killed by Outsider's guardian statue.

DCEASED
Mister Terrific appears in the DCeased one-shot comic "A Good Day to Die". Holt attempts to find a cure by analysing Apokolips and using magic. When neither of those options are viable, Holt reveals a final option; time travel. With the help of Booster Gold, Terrific and other heroes manage to find the location of Booster's time machine. He is stopped by Waverider and soon after is disemboweled by Big Barda while trying to save John Constantine.

In other media

Television

Live action
 Michael Holt is mentioned in the Smallville episode "Absolute Justice" (which featured the Justice Society) in the second half by Lois Lane, who mentions that she skipped an interview with him. He is described as a Nobel-winning scientist and tech guru. 
 A character named Curtis Holt appears in the CW series Arrow, played by Echo Kellum. When he is first introduced in season four, Curtis works with Felicity Smoak at Palmer Technology. Like his comic book incarnation, he has created the T-spheres and occasionally wears the Fair Play jacket. Curtis is a big fan of Green Arrow, and after learning that Felicity has a connection with him, he is determined to figure out his identity. In the episode "Beacon of Hope", Curtis joins Team Arrow temporarily and learns the members' identities, helping them to defeat the latest attack of Brie Larvan. In season five, Curtis officially joins Team Arrow and begins training to become a vigilante. As a vigilante, Curtis uses the name "Mr. Terrific", which is a homage to his favorite wrestling champion Terry Sloane, who went by the same name in the ring. Curtis leaves Team Arrow and Star City during season seven, returning to take part in the season finale where he helps the team against the Ninth Circle. He is confirmed to be gay and is revealed to have a boyfriend named Paul who he plans to propose to.

Animation

 Michael Holt appears in Justice League Unlimited, voiced by Michael Beach. This version became the League's Coordinator, responsible for assigning tasks to the various heroes, after J'onn J'onzz resigned from active duty.
 Michael Holt appears in the Beware the Batman episode "Hunted", voiced by Gary Anthony Williams. This version is a businessman who is kidnapped along with Simon Stagg and Alfred Pennyworth by Professor Pyg and Mr. Toad, and rescued by Batman.
 Mister Terrific appears in Justice League Action, voiced by Hannibal Buress. This version is a former child prodigy who was the college roommate of Martin Stein, as well as the self-proclaimed third smartest person in the world.

Film
 In Justice League: Crisis on Two Earths, a Parallel Earth version of Mister Terrific, named Mister Horrific, can be seen in Jester's computer, as one of Superwoman's Made Men.
 An alternate universe version of Michael Holt appears in Justice League: Gods and Monsters, voiced by Arif S. Kinchen. He was a scientist who was part of Lex Luthor's "Project Fair Play". While meeting with the other scientists (consisting of Will Magnus, John Henry Irons, Karen Beecher, Pat Dugan, Kimiyo Hoshi, Emil Hamilton, Thomas Morrow, and Stephen Shin), Michael Holt is killed with the other scientists by the Metal Men where he was impaled by the Wonderdroid. Will Magnus survived as he secretly orchestrated the attack on his fellow scientists.
 Mr. Terrific appears in the 2019 DC Universe Original Movie Justice League vs. the Fatal Five, voiced by Kevin Michael Richardson. This version is a foil to Tharok of the Fatal Five, often having to come up with ways to outwit his future know-how.
 Mr. Terrific appears in the animated film Injustice, voiced by Edwin Hodge.

Video games
 Mr. Terrific makes a background cameo in the video game Injustice: Gods Among Us. He can be seen in the reactor level of the Watchtower stage. He flies and works on the computer in the center where he is keeping the reactor in check.
 The Arrow version of Mr. Terrific is a playable in Lego DC Super-Villains as part of the DC TV Super-Heroes DLC pack.

Miscellaneous
Michael Holt is featured in the Smallville Season 11 digital comic based on the TV series. In the storyline "Chaos", he's presented as a billionaire and CEO of HoltCorp. Michael with Bruce Wayne and Ted Kord set up a supercollider project in Antarctica. Their intent was to create clean, renewable energy. However, Lex Luthor got involved with the project and hijacked it for his own purpose. Luthor's men took Michael and Kord hostage, but they managed to break free and fought back against Luthor's men, alongside Booster Gold.

Toys
 Mr. Terrific was the third figure released in the eighth wave of the DC Universe Classics line. His accessory was his T-Spheres, which could be placed into his back.
 Mr. Terrific has also received a figure in the Target-exclusive Justice League Unlimited line, packaged on a single card.

References

External links
World of Black Heroes: Mister Terrific (Michael Holt) Biography
DCComics.com's Origin of Mister Terrific
DCDP: Mister Terrific (Michael Holt)

African-American superheroes
Characters created by John Ostrander
Comics characters introduced in 1997
DC Comics martial artists
DC Comics scientists
Fictional surgeons
Fictional Olympic competitors